BNS Tista was a Kraljevica-class patrol boat in service with the  Bangladesh Navy.

Career
BNS Tista was built as PBR 505, a Type 501 Kraljevica-class patrol boat for the Yugoslav Navy in 1956. The ship along with her sister ship BNS Karnafuli were acquired from Yugoslavia in 1975 and commissioned on 6 June 1975. The ships have undergone upgrades in 1995 to 1998. After serving the Bangladesh Navy for around 47 years, she was decommissioned from service on 9 November, 2022.

Armament
The ship was armed with two Bofors 40 mm L/70 guns and four 20 mm cannon. She also carried two 128 mm rocket launchers and two racks for Mk 6 Projectors for ASW operations. She was mainly used as an ASW ship.

See also
List of historic ships of the Bangladesh Navy
BNS Karnafuli

References

Sources
 

Ships built in Croatia
Submarine chasers of Bangladesh Navy
1956 ships
Decommissioned ships of the Bangladesh Navy